The Separate Presidential Brigade "Hetman Bohdan Khmelnytskyi" is a special military unit of Ukraine and its Armed Forces which is mandated to defend the president of Ukraine in his duty as Supreme Commander-in-chief of the Armed Forces, the First Family, and the presidential residences and facilities assigned to the presidential office.

History 
By order of the National Guard on January 2, 1992, on the basis of the personnel of the 290th independent motorized rifle Novorossiysk Red Banner Lenin Komsomol special operational-purpose regiment of the Internal Troops of the MVD of the USSR, the brigade was formed as the 1st National Guard Infantry Regiment (military unit 4101) in Kyiv, in the 1st (Kyiv) Division of the National Guard (military unit 2210). In 1995, the regiment was reflagged as an infantry brigade.

The 24th independent brigade of the NGU was renamed the 24th special brigade of special purpose of the NGU by order of the KNGU on December 24, 1998. By Decree of the President of Ukraine dated October 30, 1999, the 24th Brigade was awarded the honorary title "Kyiv" for the merits of personnel in tasks ensuring public order in Ukraine's capital. 

The 24th separate Kyiv brigade of special purpose NGU was transferred to the Armed Forces of Ukraine by Decree of the President of Ukraine on December 17, 1999. The National Guard was disbanded under Ukrainian law on January 11, 2000. The headquarters of the 24th separate Kyiv brigade were converted into the headquarters of the president of Ukraine's Independent Novorossiysk-Kyiv Order of the Red Banner Special Purpose Regiment (MU A0222) - attached to the Ukrainian Ground Forces. The 2nd and 17th independent battalions of special purpose NGU were merged into this formation's linear battalions of special purpose, and the 3rd separate battalion of special purpose NGU was disbanded. The 27th special battalion of special purpose NGU was transferred to the Internal Troops of Ukraine's Ministry of Internal Affairs and became a linear battalion of the 10th Special Motorized Regiment of Internal Troops of Ukraine.

To commemorate Ukraine's tenth anniversary of independence, the Kyiv Presidential Honor Guard Battalion was incorporated into the regimental ORBAT as the new 3rd Battalion in 2001. The regiment's name was changed to the Independent Kyiv Regiment of the President of Ukraine by Decree of the President of Ukraine No. 646/2015 in 2015, and it was removed from the Order of the Red Banner. On December 15, 2017, President Petro Poroshenko bestowed the honorific "Hetman Bohdan Khmelnytsky" on the regiment and presented its new regimental battle colors in a Presentation of Colours ceremony, giving the regiment its full name of Independent Presidential Regiment "Hetman Bohdan Khmelnytskyi". The ceremony took place on the centennial anniversary of the Council of People's Commissars and the People's Secretariat's ultimatum to the government of the Ukrainian People's Republic, which signaled the start of the Soviet war in Ukraine in 1917, and marked the end of the regiment's silver jubilee. 

On Independence Day 2018, a copy of the regimental guidon of the 1st Ukrainian Infantry Regiment "Bohdan Khmelnytsky", 1st Ukrainian Corps (which fought in the Ukrainian War of Independence and was the first ever infantry regiment established in the Ukrainian People's Army at that time) was paraded by the regiment's Honor Guard Battalion, confirming the regiment's inheritance of the lineage and traditions of said regiment.

To commemorate its 30th anniversary, the regiment was upgraded to a full brigade in 2022. As a result, two new battalions were added to the brigade's expanded order of battle, joined by four further battalions in the months following. The new raisings have made the brigade one of the largest in the UGF.

Structure 
As of 2022 the brigade's structure is as follows:

Independent Presidential Brigade, Kyiv
 Brigade Headquarters and HQ Company 
 1st Special Purpose (Guards) Battalion
 2nd Special Purpose (Guards) Battalion
 1st Mechanized Infantry (Guards) Battalion
 2nd Mechanized Infantry (Guards) Battalion 
 20th Separate Special Purpose (Guards) Battalion
 21st Separate Special Purpose (Guards) Battalion
 22nd Separate Special Purpose (Guards) Battalion
 23th Separate Special Purpose (Guards) Battalion "Legion D"
 No 4 Company "Ukrainian Military Organization"
 Kyiv Presidential Honor Guard Battalion
 Band of the Kyiv Presidential Honor Guard Battalion
 1st Tank (Guards) Battalion (under formation)
 Field Artillery Battalion (Self-Propelled)
 Special Operations Company
 MP (Provost) Company
 Combat Engineer company

Command 

 Colonel Viktor Didenko (took office in 2000-2002);
 Colonel Mykola Rohovskyi (took office in 2002-2004);
 Colonel Ihor Plahuta (took office from 2005 to May 2008);
 Colonel Viktor Plakhtiy (took office from May 2008 to 2012);
 Colonel Serhii Klyavlin (took office in 2013 to ?);
 Colonel Oleksandr Bakulin (took office in 2018 to ?);
 Colonel Pavlo Hora (took office post in 2022).

Gallery

See also 

 101st Brigade for the Protection of the General Staff

References 

Military units and formations established in 1992
Regiments of Ukraine
Guards regiments
Protective security units